The Borough of Queenscliffe is a local government area in the Barwon South West region of Victoria, Australia, located in the southern part of the state. It includes only two settlements, which are Queenscliff and Point Lonsdale. It is situated on the south coast, south-east of Geelong on the Bellarine Peninsula south of Swan Bay and next to the Port Phillip Heads, the entrance to Port Phillip Bay from Bass Strait.

The Borough is governed and administered by the Queenscliffe Borough Council; its seat of local government and administrative centre is located at the council headquarters in Queenscliff. The Borough is named after the main settlement located in the centre of the LGA, that is Queenscliff, which is also the LGA's most populous urban centre with a population of 1,315.

History
The Borough of Queenscliffe was established on 12 May 1863. Queenscliff was first and foremost built for government purposes, providing postal, customs, health and telegraph services, lighthouse and signal services, military and defence establishments and the sea pilots service.

Survival of the local council restructure
Queenscliffe is the last borough remaining in both Victoria and all of Australia and was the only LGA not to have been subject to changes to its boundaries and/or name in the Victorian local government restructure which took place between 1993 and 1995. Had the same restructuring principles, which had been applied to other municipalities in the state, also been applied to Queenscliffe, the Borough would have been absorbed into the new City of Greater Geelong.

Queenscliffe's exclusion from the restructure was debated in the Victorian Parliament at the time.

Liberal Premier Jeff Kennett, in explaining his reasons, stated:

Labor member for Melbourne Neil Cole suggested that his reasons were, in fact, based on internal Liberal Party considerations:

Kennett explicitly denied that this was the case:

Labor member George Seitz suggested a more innocent reason:

Overall, the reasons for Queenscliffe being excluded remain unclear, and the range of opinions may perhaps best be summarised by Peter Loney's quip:

Reduction in number of councillors
At the 2008 elections the number of councillors was reduced from seven to the current five.

Council

Current composition
The council is composed of five councillors elected to represent an unsubdivided municipality. The current council was elected in November 2020 for a four-year term. Councillors are elected on a proportional representation basis.

Former and current Mayors
 Cr Pat Semmens (2006–2008)
 Cr Bob Merriman (2008–2012; 2018–19)
 Cr Hélène Cameron (2012–2016)
 Cr Tony Francis (2016–2017)
 Cr Susan Salter (2017–2018)
Cr Ross Ebbels (2019–pres)

Administration and governance
The council meets in the council chambers at the council headquarters in the Queenscliffe Municipal Offices, which is also the location of the council's administrative activities. It also provides customer services at its administrative centre in Queenscliff.

Townships and localities
The 2021 census, the borough had a population of 3,276 up from 2,853 in the 2016 census

^ - Territory divided with another LGA

See also
 List of places on the Victorian Heritage Register in the Borough of Queenscliffe

References

External links
 
Official website
Metlink local public transport map
Link to Land Victoria interactive maps

Local government areas of Victoria (Australia)
Barwon South West (region)
 
Boroughs of Australia
Bellarine Peninsula